Abouzar Rahimi (born September 17, 1981) is an Iranian footballer who plays for Damash Gilan in the Iran's Premier Football League.

Club career
He started his football career with Shamoushak Golestan and then moved to Shamoushak Noshahr. He was part of Shamoushak when team was promoted to Pro League on 2003 he stayed there for 5 season and after team's relegation to Division 1 joined Foolad in 2006. He joined Rah Ahan F.C. in 2007.

 Assists

References

1981 births
Living people
Rah Ahan players
Foolad FC players
Shamoushak Noshahr players
Damash Gilan players
Persian Gulf Pro League players
Iranian footballers
Association football defenders
Association football midfielders